Melos Bajrami (born 29 September 2001) is a Kosovan professional footballer who plays as a defender for Macedonian club Shkupi.

Club career

Skënderbeu Korçë
On 11 January 2021, Bajrami joined Kategoria Superiore side Skënderbeu Korçë. Five days later, he made his debut in a 1–2 home defeat against Partizani Tirana after being named in the starting line-up.

Shkupi
On 1 July 2022, Bajrami joined Macedonian First League side Shkupi. His debut with Shkupi came four days later in the 2022–23 UEFA Champions League first qualifying round against Lincoln Red Imps after coming on as a substitute at 59th minute in place of Renaldo Cephas. On 13 August 2022, Bajrami made his league debut in a 2–1 home win against Makedonija Ǵorče Petrov after being named in the starting line-up.

International career
Bajrami was eligible to represent three countries on international level, either Kosovo, North Macedonia, or Australia. On 15 March 2021, he received a call-up from Kosovo U21 for the friendly matches against Qatar U23, he was an unused substitute in these matches.

References

External links

2001 births
Living people
People from Resen, North Macedonia
Kosovan footballers

Kosovan expatriate footballers
Kosovan expatriate sportspeople in Albania
Macedonian footballers
Macedonian expatriate footballers
Macedonian expatriate sportspeople in Albania
Macedonian people of Kosovan descent
Albanians in North Macedonia
Australian soccer players
Naturalised soccer players of Australia
Australian expatriate soccer players
Australian expatriate sportspeople in Albania
Australian people of Albanian descent
Association football central defenders
Football Superleague of Kosovo players
KF Ballkani players
Kategoria Superiore players
KF Skënderbeu Korçë players
Macedonian First Football League players
KF Shkupi players